Golovishche is a rural locality (a khutor) in Zemlyanskoye Rural Settlement, Semiluksky District, Voronezh Oblast, Russia. The population was 62 as of 2010.

Geography 
Golovishche is located 43 km northwest of Semiluki (the district's administrative centre) by road. Dolgoye is the nearest rural locality.

References 

Rural localities in Semiluksky District